Iruvattam Manavaatti is a Malayalam language political romantic film. It was released on 4 February 2005. Kunchacko Boban played veterinary doctor Goutham's role in this movie.

Plot
The movie was based on the political background of Kannur. The movie was based on the life of a veterinary doctor Goutham and Bhoomika born in a strong communist family of Kannur. The movie deals with all the happenings after both of them fall in love.

Cast
 Kunchacko Boban as Dr. Goutham
 Kavya Madhavan as Bhoomika
 Murali as Const. Ananthan
 Kalabhavan Mani as Koroth Raghavan MLA / Koroth Krishnan
 Sethu Lakshmi as Koroth Madhavi
 Indrans as Attender Chandrappan / Prabhudeva
 Harisree Ashokan as  Susheelan
 Nishanth Sagar as Dr. Sudheer
 Madhu Warrier as Hareedran
 Salim Kumar as Ochira Velu
 Cochin Haneefa as Ambujakshan/ Ambiyannan
 Kalarenjini as Bhoomika's mother
 Bindhu Panicker as Chandramathi
 Ambika Mohan as 
 Mani C. Kappan as Bharathan
 Rani Larius as Rathnam/Rathnamma

References

2005 films
Indian political films
Indian romance films
Films shot in Kannur
2000s Malayalam-language films